The Dhofar Mountains are a mountain range in the southeastern part of the Arabian Peninsula. In a broad sense, they extend from Dhofar Governorate in Oman to Hadhramaut Governorate in Yemen, and are located between the Hajar in the northern part of Oman, and the Sarawat in the western part of Yemen. Otherwise, the range in the eastern part of Yemen, particularly near Mukalla, is referred to as the "Hadhramaut" or "Mahrat".

Geology 

Wildlife 

The Arabian leopard thrives here, particularly in Jabal Samhan Nature Reserve.

The Asiatic cheetah used to occur in this region. Oman's last known cheetah was killed near Jibjat in 1977 (Harrison, 1983).

In December 2018, a Schokari sand racer was spotted in a mountain in this region.

Gallery

See also 
 Geography of Oman
 Hills of Masirah Island
 South Arabia
 South Arabian fog woodlands, shrublands, and dune
 Southwestern Arabian foothills savanna

References

External links 
 Wildlife: Snapshots from Dhofar
 CNN explores Oman's Dhofar Mountains and the critically endangered Arabian leopard (YouTube)
 The Dhofar Mountains in Oman. Samhan mountain by Salim Al Barwani
 2 Discover Dhofar Mountains 2016 #GoPro
 رحلة إعادة إكتشاف جبال ظفار Discover Dhofar Mountains 2015 #GoPro

Mountain ranges of Oman
Southwestern Arabian foothills savanna